Aero DaVinci Internacional, S.A. de C.V. is an airline based in Reynosa, Tamaulipas, Mexico. It has been in operation since 1997 and operates air taxi, cargo and charter services.

Fleet 
Fairchild Swearingen Metroliner

References

External links 

Aero DaVinci

Airlines of Tamaulipas
Airlines established in 1997
Airlines of Mexico